Gary Smulyan (born April 4, 1956) is a jazz musician who plays baritone saxophone. He studied at Hofstra University before working with Woody Herman. He leads a trio with bassist Ray Drummond and drummer Kenny Washington.

Career
Smulyan has played with the Vanguard Jazz Orchestra, the Mel Lewis Big Band, the Dave Holland Big Band and Octet, the Dizzy Gillespie All Star Big Band, and he has performed and recorded with Carla Bley's Big Band. His biggest influence is Pepper Adams. When Adams died, Smulyan recorded an album entitled Homage ;to Pepper Adams) which included eight pieces composed by Adams.

Discography

As leader
 The Lure of Beauty (Criss Cross, 1991)
 Homage (Criss Cross, 1993)
 Saxophone Mosaic (Criss Cross, 1994)
 Gary Smulyan with Strings (Criss Cross, 1996)
 Blue Suite (Criss Cross, 1999)
 The Real Deal (Reservoir, 2003)
 Hidden Treasures (Reservoir, 2006)
 More Treasures (Reservoir, 2007)
 High Noon (Reservoir, 2008)
 Smul's Paradise (Capri, 2012)
 Bella Napoli with Dominic Chianese (Capri, 2013)
 Royalty at Le Duc (Groovin' High 2017)
 Alternative Contrafacts (SteepleChase, 2018)

As sideman
With Dizzy Gillespie All-Star Big Band and Alumni All-Star Big Band
 Things to Come (MCG, 2002)
 Dizzy's Business (MCG, 2006)
 I'm BeBoppin' Too (Half Note, 2008)

With Woody Herman
 Woody and Friends (Concord Jazz, 1981)
 La Fiesta (West Wind, 1991)
 The Woody Herman Orchestra (Jazz Door, 1991)

With Dave Holland
 What Goes Around (ECM, 2002)
 Overtime (Dare2, 2004)
 Pathways (Dare2, 2010)

With the Mel Lewis Orchestra
 Make Me Smile & Other New Works by Bob Brookmeyer (Finesse, 1982)
 20 Years at the Village Vanguard (Atlantic, 1986)
 Soft Lights and Hot Music (Musicmasters, 1988)
 The Lost Art (Musicmasters, 1989)
 The Definitive Thad Jones (Musicmasters, 1989)
 The Definitive Thad Jones Volume 2 (Musicmasters, 1990)
 To You (Musicmasters, 1991)

With the Vanguard Jazz Orchestra
 Lickety Split (New World, 1997)
 Thad Jones Legacy (New World, 1999)
 Can I Persuade You? (Planet Arts, 2001)
 The Way (Planet Arts, 2004)
 Up from the Skies (Planet Arts, 2006)
 Monday Night Live at the Village Vanguard (Planet Arts, 2008)
 Forever Lasting: Live in Tokyo (Planet Arts, 2011)
 Overtime Music of Bob Brookmeyer (Planet Arts, 2014)

With others
 Harry Allen, The Candy Men (Arbors, 2016)
 Carla Bley, Looking for America (WATT/ECM, 2003)
 David Byrne, Grown Backwards (Nonesuch, 2004)
 Michel Camilo, One More Once (Columbia, 1994)
 Michel Camilo, Caribe (Calle 54, 2009)
 Carnegie Hall Jazz Band, The Carnegie Hall Jazz Band/Music Director Jon Faddis (Blue Note, 1996)
 Freddy Cole, Merry-Go-Round (Telarc, 2000)
 George Coleman, Danger High Voltage (Two and Four, 2000)
 Dena DeRose, We Won't Forget You...An Homage to Shirley Horn (HighNote, 2014)
 Bill Evans, Push (Lipstick, 1994)
 Gil Evans, Hidden Treasures Vol. 1 (Monday Nights, 2018)
 Jon Faddis, Teranga (Koch, 2006)
 John Fedchock, Up & Running (Reservoir, 2007)
 John Fedchock, Like It Is (Mama, 2015)
 Don Friedman, Don Friedman the Composer Live at Jazz Baltica Salzau (Enja, 2010)
 Benny Green, The Place to Be (Blue Note, 1994)
 Tom Harrell, Labyrinth (RCA Victor, 1996)
 Tom Harrell, The Art of Rhythm (RCA Victor, 1998)
 Gene Harris, Live at Town Hall N.Y.C. (Concord Jazz, 1989)
 Gene Harris, World Tour 1990 (Concord Jazz, 1991)
 Jimmy Heath, Turn Up the Heath (Planet Arts, 2006)
 Joe Henderson, Big Band (Verve, 1996)
 Conrad Herwig, The Latin Side of John Coltrane (Astor Place, 1996)
 Freddie Hubbard, MMTC: Monk, Miles, Trane & Cannon (MusicMasters, 1995)
 Denise Jannah, I Was Born in Love with You (Blue Note, 1995)
 B.B. King, Live at the Apollo (GRP, 1991)
 Mike LeDonne, Bout Time (Criss Cross, 1988)
 Mike LeDonne, The Feeling of Jazz (Criss Cross, 1990)
 Joe Lovano, 52nd Street Themes (Blue Note, 2000)
 Joe Lovano, Streams of Expression (Blue Note, 2006)
 Joe Magnarelli, Always There (Criss Cross, 1997)
 Joe Magnarelli, Persistence (Reservoir, 2008)
 Kevin Mahogany, Songs and Moments (Enja, 1994)
 Mark Masters, The Clifford Brown Project (Capri, 2003)
 Mingus Big Band, Gunslinging Birds (Dreyfus, 1995)
 Mingus Big Band, Live in Time (Dreyfus, 1996)
 Grachan Moncur III, Exploration (Capri, 2004)
 Eddie Palmieri, Full Circle (Ropeadope, 2018)
 Eddie Palmieri, Mi Luz Mayor (Ropeadope, 2018)
 Charlie Parker, Bird (Columbia, 2011)
 Charlie Persip, Charlie Persip and Gerry Lafurn's 17-Piece Superband (Stash, 1981)
 Charlie Persip, Charli Persip & Superband (Natasha, 1994)
 Diana Ross, Live Stolen Moments (Motown, 1993)
 Rob Schneiderman, Radio Waves (Reservoir, 1991)
 John Scofield, Up All Night (Verve, 2003)
 Don Sickler, Night Watch (Uptown, 1995)
 Mark Soskin, Keys of the City (Koei, 1990)
 Dave Stryker, Blue to the Bone IV (SteepleChase, 2013)
 Roseanna Vitro, Catchin' Some Rays (Telarc, 1997)
 Walt Weiskopf, Day in Night Out (Criss Cross, 2008)
 Gerald Wilson, In My Time (Mack Avenue, 2005)
 Gerald Wilson, Legacy (Mack Avenue, 2011)

References

External links
   Jazz portal. Gary Smulyan (4.04.1956 Bethpage, New York, US) American jazz baritone saxophonist

1956 births
Living people
Jazz musicians from New York (state)
People from Bethpage, New York
21st-century saxophonists
American jazz baritone saxophonists
Criss Cross Jazz artists
Reservoir Records artists